Janina Kurkowska-Spychajowa (February 8, 1901 in Starosielce – June 6, 1979) was a Polish archer. With an unprecedented five overall FITA Outdoor Archery World Championships titles (1933, 1934, 1936, 1939 and 1947), Kurkowska-Spychajowa is the most decorated archer at the World Championships. Her medal haul at the World Championships level spanned 24 years, from 1931 when she won a (mixed) individual silver medal in the inaugural World Championships until 1955 when she helped Poland to win a ladies' team bronze medal.

References

1901 births
1979 deaths
Polish female archers
Sportspeople from Białystok
World Archery Championships medalists